Lance Telford Painter (born July 21, 1967) is an English former Major League Baseball left-handed pitcher who played for the Colorado Rockies (-), St. Louis Cardinals (-), Toronto Blue Jays (-), and Milwaukee Brewers. Although he started 28 games, Painter is most known as a reliever.

Professional career
Painter played college baseball at the University of Wisconsin–Madison. Painter was drafted in the 25th round of the 1990 Major League Baseball Draft by the San Diego Padres. While playing with the Rockies in the 1995 NLDS he pinch hit in the ninth inning of game one (striking out), then started the next day in a losing effort against the Atlanta Braves. During the  season with the Cardinals, Painter appeared in 65 games, went 4–0, and posted a 3.99 ERA. Painter appeared in 314 major league games and posted a career ERA of 5.24. He retired after the 2003 season.

Coaching career
Lance was the pitching coach of the Great Britain national baseball team during the 2005 European Baseball Championships in the Czech Republic. GB placed 7th, just missing out on the qualification round for the World Championships. Lance is now the Pitching Coach for the Tacoma Rainiers.

From -, Painter was the pitching coach of the Single-A Wisconsin Timber Rattlers in the Seattle Mariners organization. In , he was named the pitching coach for the Single-A High Desert Mavericks. On 13 January , he was named the pitching coach of the Single-A Clinton LumberKings. After the 2009 season he was named the pitching coach for the Double-A West Tenn Diamond Jaxx of the Southern League.

References

External links

1967 births
Living people
Colorado Rockies players
Major League Baseball players from the United Kingdom
Major League Baseball players from England
English baseball players
Great Britain national baseball team people
Sportspeople from Bedford
Milwaukee Brewers players
St. Louis Cardinals players
Toronto Blue Jays players
Palm Beach Cardinals players
Dunedin Blue Jays players
Indianapolis Indians players
Spokane Indians players
Colorado Springs Sky Sox players
Memphis Redbirds players
Louisville Redbirds players
Waterloo Diamonds players
Wichita Wranglers players
Arkansas Travelers players
Major League Baseball pitchers
Wisconsin Badgers baseball players